The Zhongcheng Gate is a gate in Dongyin Township, Lienchiang County, Taiwan.

History
The gate was originally built as the port for the Republic of China Armed Forces to enter and exit the island. The function of the port was later on replaced by Zhongzhu Harbor. During the Mainland China military exercises around Matsu Islands in August 2022, local people were seen dancing in foam to music in front of the gate.

Architecture
The gate features a soldier statue on top of it.

References

Buildings and structures in Lienchiang County
Gates in Taiwan
Tourist attractions in Lienchiang County